Mudyuga is a rural locality (a settlement) in Onezhsky District, Arkhangelsk Oblast, Russia. The population was 573 as of 2010. There are 14 streets.

Geography 
Mudyuga is located on the Mudyuga River, 77 km southeast of the town Onega (the district's administrative centre) by road. Verkhovye is the nearest rural locality.

References 

Rural localities in Onezhsky District